WRLC may refer to:

 Washington Research Library Consortium
 WRLC (FM), a radio station (91.7 FM) licensed to Williamsport, Pennsylvania, United States
 Bontang Airport, in Bontang, Indonesia (ICAO code WRLC)
 WVPH (90.3 The Core) in Piscataway, New Jersey.  The station's current incarnation is the result of a merger between the former Livingston College radio station WRLC-AM, and Piscataway High School's radio station.  The station still uses "RLC" in its branding.